The following is the complete list of awards and nominations received by 2015 film Sicario.

Awards and nominations

References

External links
 

Sicario
Sicario (film series)